C. V. M. P. Ezhilarasan (in Tamil: சி. வி. எம். பி. எழிலரசன்) is an Indian politician and Member of the Tamil Nadu Legislative Assembly. He contested the 2016 and 2021 Tamil Nadu Assembly elections from Kanchipuram constituency as a candidate of the Dravida Munnetra Kazhagam and was elected to the Tamil Nadu Legislative Assembly. He is well known friend to Udhayanidhi Stalin who is the current Youth Wing secretary of DMK party and Member of Legislative Assembly from Chepauk-Triplicane constituency. It is a friendship between two families that span for decades. Beginning with the grandfathers CVM Annamalai and M.Karunanidhi; then the fathers CVMA.Ponmozhi and MK Stalin; And now the sons CVMP.Ezhilarasan and Udhayanithi Stalin-the bond they share for three generations is widely known in the political circle.

Electoral performance

References

Tamil Nadu politicians
Living people
1971 births
Tamil Nadu MLAs 2016–2021
Tamil Nadu MLAs 2021–2026